Providence Academy is an independent, private, classical academy in the Catholic tradition established in 2005 to assist parents in the intellectual, moral and spiritual formation of their children from pre-kindergarten through twelfth grade. The school is not affiliated with the Diocese of La Crosse nor La Crosse Aquinas Catholic Schools.

External links
Providence Academy
Providence Academy combines Catholic and classical education-Dan Simmons-La Crosse Tribune
A class of one: Providence Academy celebrates milestone, Autumn Grooms, La Crosse Tribune

Private high schools in Wisconsin
Buildings and structures in La Crosse, Wisconsin
St. Ambrose Academy
Schools in La Crosse County, Wisconsin
Private middle schools in Wisconsin
Private elementary schools in Wisconsin
2005 establishments in Wisconsin